Andrea Pio Scarpa (born 3 June 1987) is an Italian professional boxer. He held the WBC Silver light-welterweight title in 2016 and challenged twice for the European light-welterweight title in 2018 and 2019.

Professional career
Scarpa made his professional debut on 9 April 2011, scoring a fourth-round technical knockout (TKO) victory over Cristian Spataru in Biella, Italy. 

He went on to lose his next two fights by points decision (PTS) – against Carmine Tommasone in June and Vincenzo Finiello in July 2011 – before embarking on a six fight winning streak, after which he faced Nicola Cipolletta for the vacant Italian super-featherweight title. The bout took place on 27 July 2012 in Castel Volturno, Italy, with Scarpa capturing the Italian title via ninth-round knockout (KO). He scored a TKO win against Istvan Petrovics in a non-title fight in October before successfully defending his Italian title via TKO against Floriano Pagliara in January 2013.

In his next fight he moved up in weight to challenge Italian light-welterweight champion Renato De Donato on 21 June 2013 at the Centro Sportivo Crespi in Milan, Italy. Scarpa knocked Donato to the canvas in the seventh round. After making it back to his feet before the referee's count of ten, the champion was met with a flurry of punches to prompt the referee to call a halt to the contest, handing Scarpa the Italian light-welterweight title via seventh-round TKO.

After scoring six more wins in non-title fights, two by stoppage, he faced Francesco Acatullo for the vacant Italian light-welterweight title on 24 January 2015 at the Palasport Piscine Italcementi in Bergamo, Italy. After a back-and-forth contest Scarpa captured the title for a second time, defeating Acatullo via unanimous decision (UD) over ten rounds. Two judges scored the bout 98–92 and the third scored it 97–93.

He successfully defended his Italian title with a KO victory over Emanuele De Prophetis in June before facing Lyes Chaibi for the vacant IBF Inter-Continental light-welterweight title on 27 November 2015 at the Palasport Le Cupole in Turin, Italy. Scarpa captured his third professional title, defeating Prophetis via UD over twelve rounds with the scorecards reading 116–111, 115–112, and 115–113.

He next faced John Wayne Hibbert for the vacant WBC Silver light-welterweight title on 25 June 2015, fighting abroad for the first time in his career at The O2 Arena in London. The fight was televised live on Sky Sports Box Office as part of the undercard for Anthony Joshua vs. Dominic Breazeale. Scarpa connected with a left hook in the second round which opened a cut above Hibbert's right eye. The cut began to worsen over the next few rounds and after an examination by the ringside doctor in the sixth – who deemed the cut too severe for Hibbert to continue – the referee called a halt to the contest, handing Scarpa the WBC Silver title via sixth round TKO.

He returned to England for the first defence of his title, facing Ohara Davies on 26 November 2016 at The SSE Arena in London. In what was described as a dominant performance by Davies, Scarpa lost his WBC Silver title by a shutout UD with all three judges scoring the bout 120–108.

He bounced back from defeat with two six-round PTS victories in 2017 – against Juan Ocura in May and Giorgi Abramishvili in June – before challenging the European Union light-welterweight champion Franck Petitjean on 20 January 2018 at the Palais des sports Marcel-Cerdan in Paris. Scarpa suffered the fourth defeat of his career, losing by UD with the judges' scorecards reading 115–113, 116–112, and 117–111.

Following a six-round PTS victory against Luka Leskovic in May he faced Joe Hughes for the vacant European light-welterweight title on 30 November 2018 at the Teatro Obi Hall in Florence, Italy. Scarpa lost the bout by split decision (SD) to suffer his fifth professional defeat. One judge scored the bout 116–112 in favour of Scarpa while the other two judges scored it 116–112 and 118–110 for Hughes.

After a stoppage victory by corner retirement (RTD) against Ivan Njegac in April 2019, he made a second attempt for the vacant European title, facing Sandor Martin on 27 July at the Pabellón Francisco Calvo in Barcelona, Spain. Scarpa lost in his attempt by ninth-round RTD. At the time of the stoppage he was behind on all three judges' scorecards at 90–81, having lost all nine rounds.

Professional boxing record

References

External links

Living people
1987 births
Italian male boxers
Super-featherweight boxers
Light-welterweight boxers
Sportspeople from Foggia